Culburra may refer to:

Culburra Beach, New South Wales, a town in Australia
Culburra, South Australia, a town and locality
 a former name of Clare, Queensland, Australia